Bernterode is a village and a former municipality in the district of Eichsfeld in Thuringia, Germany. Since 1 January 2019, it is part of the town Heilbad Heiligenstadt.

References

Eichsfeld (district)
Former municipalities in Thuringia